John Shedd Reed (1917 in Chicago, Illinois – March 16, 2008 in Lake Forest, Illinois) was president of the Atchison, Topeka and Santa Fe Railway and then its parent Santa Fe Industries from 1967 until 1986.  The rail transport industry journal Modern Railways named Reed its Man of the Year for 1970. Reed was popularly known as "John Santa Fe" by his employees. Prior to his ascendancy as president, Reed oversaw the final transition of the Santa Fe from steam to Diesel engines in 1957.

He was educated at The Hotchkiss School and Yale University.  He served as the president of Shedd Aquarium in Chicago, Illinois, from 1984 to 1994.  Reed's grandfather was John G. Shedd, founder of the aquarium.

References 

Atchison, Topeka and Santa Fe Railway presidents
20th-century American railroad executives
Hotchkiss School alumni
Yale University alumni
1917 births
2008 deaths